First Test, is a fantasy novel by Tamora Pierce, the first book in the series Protector of the Small. It details the first year of Keladry of Mindelan's training as a page of Tortall.

Plot introduction
Protector of the Small is set in the Tortallan world of Pierce's Song of the Lioness and The Immortals quartets. The protagonist is Keladry of Mindelan, a young girl who becomes the first female to train as a knight ten years after King Jonathan first declared it legal. The novel tracks the first year of Keladry's training, during which she is only accepted on a probationary basis. Keladry must struggle to prove herself worthy to palace training master Wyldon of Cavall and her fellow page trainees.

Plot summary
In this book, Keladry of Mindelan, known as Kel, faces a tough year ahead to become a page when Lord Wyldon has put her on probation. She finds a way to cope with being in probation and trying to accept herself and push herself so Lord Wyldon will approve.

The first Protector of the Small book tells of Kel's fight to become an accepted and equally-treated first-year page. Whilst the laws of Tortall may have been changed to favour gender equality, the reality of entering into a traditionally male domain presents many hurdles. Kel is accepted into the royal page program. However, she is placed on probation for the first year. She is forced to deal with hazing from her all-male peers, including derogatory writing on her walls, the destruction of her belongings, and discrimination from the training master. This is in addition to Kel being the first female to openly try to become a knight within the century. Throughout the novel, there is the ever-lurking question of whether the training master will let her continue to train, because he, like many, does not believe that women can equal men in combat. While all this is going on, a secret benefactor encourages her with gifts.

When Kel is getting ready for her first day of training, she receives an unexpected gift of a new dagger of incredibly high quality and a whetstone for sharpening, which, at that time, were unaffordable except by people of the higher classes. At midwinter feast time, she also receives a powerful bruise balm from a mysterious gift-giver.

Keladry hates bullies, and after realizing that Joren of Stone Mountain and his friends were bullying first year pages, she defied tradition and started patrolling the halls, fighting the boys whenever she found them hurting others. Nealan, also known as Neal to his friends (possibly the oldest page in the history of pages) becomes her best friend as well as her sponsor, and the other first-year pages gradually accept Kel (as she is known to her friends and family) as she defends them from the bullies.

American fantasy novels
Tortallan books
1999 American novels
1999 fantasy novels